Mahestan (also Romanized as Gāv Darreh and . ; also known as Gavādar, Gavadar, Gawādar, and Savār Dāreh) is a village in Sain Qaleh Rural District, in the Central District of Abhar County, Zanjan Province, Iran. At the 2006 census, its population was 386, in 95 families.

References 

Populated places in Abhar County